Switchboard is the second-oldest LGBT+ telephone helpline in the United Kingdom, launched the day after Edinburgh Befrienders (later known as Lothian Gay and Lesbian Switchboard).

Switchboard was launched in March 1974 as the London Lesbian and Gay Switchboard, providing help and information to London's gay community, particularly in the aftermath of the 1967 partial decriminalisation of male homosexuality in England and Wales. It received its first call on 4 March 1974.

In the 1980s, Switchboard was the leading source of information on HIV/AIDS, with some of Switchboard's volunteers amongst the founding members of the Terrence Higgins Trust.

In 2008, Switchboard was the recipient of the Queen's Award for Voluntary Service. The organisation was invited and accepted to go to Buckingham Palace to collect the award. In 2014, Queen Elizabeth II acknowledged the 40th anniversary of the organisation's founding, marking the first time she has had any involvement, voiced support or recognised an LGBT charity during her reign, and the first time the Crown has ever publicly supported the LGBT community. LLGS received a comment from the Queen saying: "Best wishes and congratulations to all concerned on this most special anniversary."

Switchboard rebranded to its current name in 2015 to emphasize inclusion for persons of all sexual orientation and gender identities, and that its services are not limited to London.

Today, it has expanded considerably to more than 15,000 callers each year, and now also provides support through email and instant messaging. Switchboard provides a listening service for people to discuss their feelings in an impartial and non-judgmental way, as well as information and advice for going out in London and the UK.

See also 
Brighton & Hove LGBT Switchboard
Gay & Lesbian Switchboard of New York
London Friend

References

External links

LGBT organisations in London
Charities based in London
LGBT culture in London
1974 establishments in the United Kingdom
Crisis hotlines
Organizations established in 1974